The 2021 Women's Asian Champions Trophy was the sixth edition of the Women's Asian Champions Trophy, a biennial field hockey tournament for the six best Asian women's national teams organized by the Asian Hockey Federation.

The tournament was held at the Donghae City Sunrise Stadium in Donghae, South Korea and it was originally scheduled from 14 to 21 June 2020. South Korea were the defending champions.

Due to the COVID-19 pandemic the tournament was postponed on 26 March 2020. In September 2020 the new dates were announced and the tournament would be held from 31 March to 6 April 2021.  In January 2021 the tournament was postponed again  and in October was postponed further to 5 to 12 December 2021.

Teams
The following four teams will be participating in the tournament. Malaysia could not play their first two matches of the tournament and eventually had to withdraw due to Covid-related issues. On 9 December India also had to withdraw from the tournament due to the same reason.

Notes

Results
All times are local, KST (UTC+9).

First round

Classification round

Third place game

Final

Statistics

Final standings

Goalscorers

See also
2021 Men's Asian Champions Trophy

References

Asian Champions Trophy
Women's Asian Champions Trophy
International women's field hockey competitions hosted by South Korea
Donghae City
Sport in Gangwon Province, South Korea
Champions Trophy
Asian Champions Trophy
Asian Champions Trophy